Éric Millot (12 December 1968) is a French former competitive figure skater. He is the 1993 European bronze medalist, the 1995–96 Champions Series Final bronze medalist, and a four-time (1990–93) French national champion. He represented France at the 1992 Winter Olympics in Albertville, where he placed 15th, and at the 1994 Winter Olympics in Lillehammer, where he placed 7th.  With wife Valerie and young daughter Marie, the Millot family moved to California (Palm Springs and then San Diego) in the late 1990s.  While in San Diego, Millot skated with Sea World summer nights skating show and coached at local rinks.  Son Leo Millot was born in 2006.  In 2013, Millot relocated to the Toyota Sports Center in El Segundo, California to coach alongside Frank Carroll.

Competitive highlights
GP: Champions Series (Grand Prix)

References

Olympic figure skaters of France
Figure skaters at the 1992 Winter Olympics
Figure skaters at the 1994 Winter Olympics
French male single skaters
1968 births
Living people
Sportspeople from Reims
European Figure Skating Championships medalists
French emigrants to the United States